Palaeomastodon an extinct genus of Proboscidea. Palaeomastodon fossils have been found in Africa, where they lived some 36-35 million years ago. They are believed to be the ancestors of elephants or mastodons. Palaeomastodon lived in marshy semi aquatic swamps during the  middle late Eocene to the early Oligocene. It may  have used its upper pair of tusks for scraping bark off trees. Palaeomastodon was a very early form of elephant and thus had a very short trunk.

Palaeomastodon had tusks, both upper and lower, and it had a trunk. The lower tusks were flat rather than pointed cones, and were probably used to scoop plants from swampy water.

Palaeomastodon was known to have their ears located towards the top of their heads, to make sure their sensory organs remained dry. In addition, their sharp tusks were used as a defense weapon.

References 

Elephantiformes
Oligocene proboscideans
Eocene proboscideans
Eocene mammals of Africa
Oligocene mammals of Africa
Transitional fossils
Prehistoric placental genera
Fossil taxa described in 1901